Jalo Oasis (or Jalu, or Gialo) is an oasis in Cyrenaica, Libya, located west of the Great Sand Sea and about 250 km south-east of the Gulf of Sidra. Jalu was the administrative capital of the Jalu District from 1983 to 1988, at which time the area became part of the Ajdabiya District and as of 2007 is now part of the Al Wahat District. 

Because of its location and as a source of water, it had strategic importance during the North African Campaign in World War II and changed hands several times between Allied and Axis forces. 

The water at the Jalo oasis is quite salty (3,880 parts per million). The water is an alkaline with a pH of 7.4 and is very hard with numerous dissolved salts in addition to sodium chloride.

Communities
In addition to Jalu, the oasis supports the following communities:
Al Hiri
Labba
Shurraf
Masliwa
Rashida

Notes

Further reading
 Hassanein, Ahmed Mohammed (1925) The Lost Oasis Butterworth, London 
 Walton, Kenneth (1952) "The Aberdeen University Expedition to Cyrenaica, 1951: Part 2: The oasis of Jalo" Scottish Geographical Magazine 68(3): pp. 110–119

Oases of Libya